Uruguay consists of 19 departments (departamentos). Each department has a legislature called a Departmental Board. The Intendente is the department's chief executive.

History
The first division of the Republic into six departments occurred on 27 January 1816. In February of the same year, two more departments were formed, and in 1828 one more was added. When the First Constitution was signed in 1830, there were nine departments. These were the departments of Montevideo, Maldonado, Canelones, San José, Colonia, Soriano, Paysandú, Durazno and Cerro Largo. At that time, the department of Paysandú occupied all the territory north of the Río Negro, which included the current departments of Artigas, Rivera, Tacuarembó, Salto, Paysandú and Río Negro.

On 17 June 1837 a new division of Uruguay was made and this northern territory was divided in three parts by the creation of the departments of Salto and Tacuarembó. At the same time the department of Minas (which was eventually renamed to Lavalleja) was created out of parts of Cerro Largo and Maldonado. Then in 1856 the department of Florida was created and on 7 July 1880 the department of Río Negro was split from Paysandú and the department of Rocha was split from Maldonado. In 1884 the department of Treinta y Tres was formed from parts of Cerro Largo and Minas, while also the department of Artigas was split from Salto, and in the same year the department of Rivera was split from Tacuarembó. Finally in the end of 1885 the department of Flores was split from San José.

List of departments

Statutory framework

Establishment of departments 
The General Assembly has the powers to create new departments, requiring a special majority vote of two thirds of the number of members of both chambers, as provided by the Constitution in article 85. The General Assembly can also define their borders, requiring the same majority.

Politics and governance 
The basic statutory framework of departments is defined by Section XVI of the Constitution. Each department has Executive and Legislative branches, the former consisting of the Intendant and the latter by the Departmental Board. The Municipal Organic Law No. 9515 regulates more specific details of these rules.

Finances 
The sources of financial resources of the departmental governments are detailed in article 297 of the Constitution, being the departmental taxes, national taxes whose administration was granted to departments, earnings from services or incomes, money obtained from sanctions, donations, inheritances and bequests received and accepted, and their own part of the National Budged that they were granted by Budget Laws.

Municipalities

Since 2009 (Law No. 18567 of 13 September 2009), the Uruguayan departments have been subdivided into municipalities. As Uruguay is a very small country (3 million inhabitants, of which roughly half live in the national capital), this system has been widely criticized as a waste of resources. Nevertheless, in the municipal elections of 2010 the local authorities were elected and they assumed office months later. Currently there are 125 municipalities scattered all over the country.

See also
List of postal codes in Uruguay
ISO 3166-2:UY

References

External links

 Congreso Nacional de Intendentes 

 
Subdivisions of Uruguay
Uruguay, Departments
Departments, Uruguay
Uruguay geography-related lists